Saint-Rémi may refer to:
 Saint Rémi or Remigius (c. 437–533), Bishop of Reims
 Basilica of Saint-Remi, a medieval abbey church in Reims, France
 Musée Saint-Remi, a former abbey in Reims, France
 French ship Saint-Rémi, a 400-ton ship active in 1785
 Saint-Rémi, Quebec, a city in Les Jardins-de-Napierville 
 Saint-Rémi-de-Tingwick, Quebec, a municipality in Centre-du-Québec